Alex Singer may refer to:

 Alexander Singer (born 1932), film director
 Alex Singer (soccer) (born 1987), soccer player

See also
 Alex (singer) (born 1978), Danish singer, songwriter and actor